Catocala seibaldi is a moth in the family Erebidae. It is found in China (Shaanxi).

References

 , 2010: A new synonymy in the genus Catocala (Lepidoptera, Noctuidae). Acta Zoologica Lituanica 20 (4): 204. Full article: .
 , 2010: Two new species of Catocala Schrank, 1802 from China (Lepidoptera: Noctuidae). Tinea 21 (2): 45-48.
 , 2010: A new Catocala species (Lepidoptera: Noctuidae) from China. Tinea 21 (2): 82-87.

seibaldi
Moths described in 2010
Moths of Asia